Inga Orekhova (born 10 November 1989) is a Ukrainian professional basketball player who last played for the Connecticut Sun of the WNBA. The Dream waived her in early June. On May 14, 2015, Orekhova signed with the Connecticut Sun

USF career
Orekhova was the 20th USF women's basketball player to score 1,000 career points. She shot 89 percent (65-for-73) in one season, a USF single-season record.

South Florida statistics
Source

References

External links
USF bio

1989 births
Living people
Atlanta Dream draft picks
Atlanta Dream players
Guards (basketball)
Junior college women's basketball players in the United States
South Florida Bulls women's basketball players
Sportspeople from Sevastopol
Ukrainian expatriate basketball people in the United States
Ukrainian women's basketball players